Ballyea North (Baile Uí Aodha Thuaidh in Irish) is a townland in the historical Barony of Owney and Arra, County Tipperary, Ireland. It is located in the civil parish of Templeachally between Ballina, County Tipperary and the M7 motorway.

References

Townlands of County Tipperary